The Mälaren Line is a railway line from Stockholm via Västerås to Örebro in Sweden. The section from Stockholm to Kolbäck and from Valskog to Arboga has double track. The line was upgraded to high-speed in 2005. The line is mostly used by passenger trains, although it is also served by some freight trains. It takes its name from lake Mälaren, along the northern edge of which the railway runs. To the west, the line connects with the Freight Line Through Bergslagen. The Stockholm commuter rail system uses the tracks east of Bålsta, in addition to the intercity trains.

Map

References

External links 
 

Railway lines in Sweden